Derek Stanley (born 27 August 1985 in Madison, Wisconsin) is a former American football wide receiver. He was drafted by the St. Louis Rams in the seventh round of the 2007 NFL Draft. He played college football at the University of Wisconsin–Whitewater. Currently, Stanley is the wide receivers coach for Lindenwood University.

Early years
Stanley attended Verona Area High School and was a student and a letterman in football, basketball, and track. In football, he was a two-time All-Area selection and was twice named as an All-Conference selection. The Wisconsin State Journal named Stanley Wisconsin's high school football player of the year in 2002, after he amassed more than 2,000 yards rushing in his senior season at Verona Area High School.'

College career
Stanley played wide receiver at the University of Wisconsin–Whitewater. In addition, he was a track All-America and ran a reported 4.32 forty-yard dash.

Professional career

St. Louis Rams
The St. Louis Rams drafted Stanley in the seventh round (249th overall) in the 2007 NFL Draft. He was assigned No. 19 by the Rams and was signed to a three-year contract in June 2007.

In his first game on August 1, 2007, a preseason game against the Minnesota Vikings, Stanley had four receptions for 61 yards. He was waived from the roster the last round of cuts but was re-signed to the practice squad.

On December 14, Stanley was promoted to the active roster. He made his regular season debut two days later against the Green Bay Packers with a 19-yard kickoff return. He appeared in three games for the team, returning 20 kicks for 509 yards and fumbling once. He also had one carry for five yards and a solo tackle on special teams.

Stanley spent the first four games of the 2008 regular season on the Rams' practice squad before being signed to the active roster on October 10. The team waived safety Brannon Condren to make room for Stanley on the roster. His first career reception came on November 2, 2008 against the Arizona Cardinals. He made a spectacular 80 yard, one handed grab resulting in a touchdown.

He was waived on September 22, 2009 to make room for newly signed Danny Amendola.

Toronto Argonauts
On May 27, 2010, Stanley was signed by the Toronto Argonauts of the Canadian Football League. He was later released by the Argonauts on June 17, 2010.

References

External links
St. Louis Rams bio

1985 births
Living people
Sportspeople from Madison, Wisconsin
Players of American football from Wisconsin
American football wide receivers
American football return specialists
Wisconsin–Whitewater Warhawks football players
St. Louis Rams players
People from Verona, Wisconsin